Ofir Sofer (born 1 August 1975) is an Israeli politician. He is currently the Minister of Aliyah and Integration and a member of the Knesset for the Religious Zionist Party.

Sofer is a former IDF major and is considered a disabled veteran. Afterwards he worked at the Ministry for the Development of the Periphery, the Negev and the Galilee.

Political career
In 2014, he became secretary general of the Orthodox-nationalist Tkuma party. When the party joined the Union of Right-Wing Parties alliance for the April 2019 Knesset elections, Sofer was placed fourth on the alliances' list, and entered the Knesset when it won five seats. During the 2021 election he ran in Likud list for the Knesset, as a member of Atid Ehad party, using it as a shelf party. On 14 June he split from Likud and merged with the Religious Zionist Party, after the swearing-in of the 36th government. The split was not officially approved until 27 June.

Ahead of the 2022 election, Sofer was given the third spot on a joint list between the Religious Zionist Party and Otzma Yehudit, and was re-elected to the Knesset as a result. On 29 December 2022, Sofer was appointed Minister of Aliyah and Integration in the new government.

Personal life
Sofer is married, has 7 children, and lives in Tefahot, a religious moshav in Northern Israel.

He is of Tunisian-Jewish descent.

References

External links

1975 births
Living people
Atid Ehad politicians
20th-century Israeli military personnel
21st-century Israeli civil servants
21st-century Israeli military personnel
Members of the Knesset with disabilities
Israeli officers
Israeli Orthodox Jews
Israeli people of Tunisian-Jewish descent
Jewish Israeli politicians
Jewish military personnel
Likud politicians
Members of the 21st Knesset (2019)
Members of the 22nd Knesset (2019–2020)
Members of the 23rd Knesset (2020–2021)
Members of the 24th Knesset (2021–2022)
Members of the 25th Knesset (2022–)
Moshavniks
People from Northern District (Israel)
Religious Zionist Party politicians
The Jewish Home politicians
Yamina politicians